Competition climbing is a type of rock climbing held indoors on purpose-built artificial climbing walls, although earlier versions were held on external natural rock surfaces. The three standalone competition climbing disciplines are: lead climbing, bouldering, and speed climbing. A fourth discipline of "combined" is based on combinations of results in the three main disciplines.  Competition climbing is sometimes called "sport climbing", which is the type of lead climbing performed in competition climbing. 

In competition lead climbing, competitors start at the bottom of a pre-bolted sport climbing route to reach the highest hold possible within a set time limit on a single attempt, making sure to clip the rope into pre-placed quickdraws while ascending.  In competition bouldering, competitors climb short problems without a rope, with an emphasis on the number of problems completed, and the attempts necessary to do so. In competition speed climbing, competitors climb a standardised route using a top rope, in the shortest time possible.

The International Federation of Sport Climbing (IFSC) organizes the most important international competition climbing events, including the biennial IFSC Climbing World Championships, and the annual IFSC Climbing World Cup that is held as a series of events during the year. Competition climbing was featured at the Summer Olympics for the first time in 2020, in a once-off single combined format per gender, with the results based on a combination of lead climbing, bouldering, and speed climbing performances. The format for  climbing at the 2024 Olympics has speed climbing as a standalone event, although lead and boulder are still a combined event.

History

Competition climbing dates from the arrival of sport climbing in the mid-1980s, which is a type of rock climbing where the climbing protection is pre-bolted into the climbing route, so the climber does not have to worry about their safety while ascending. However, later in 1985, the first internationally recognized competition climbing event was held at Sportroccia, which later became the annual Rock Master competition. These were annual lead climbing competitions held outdoors on natural rock surfaces and their first winners were Stefan Glowacz,  Patrick Edlinger and Catherine Destivelle.

In 1988–89, the French Federation and Paul Brasset convinced the UIAA to regulate and administer competition climbing; it was agreed that events would be held on indoor artificial climbing walls. In 1989, the first UIAA Climbing World Cup was held over seven events around the world. In 1991, the first biennial UIAA World Climbing Championships is held in Frankfurt. In 1992, the first UIAA Climbing World Youth Championships is held in Basel. In 1998, bouldering and speed climbing are added alongside lead climbing for UIAA competition climbing events. In 2005, competition climbing was added to the World Games. In 2006-07, the UIAA ceded governance of competition climbing to a newly formed International Federation of Sport Climbing (IFSC) that received provisional recognition by the International Olympic Committee.

In August 2016, the IOC announced that competition climbing would be a sport in the 2020 Summer Olympics. During August 3–6, 2021, Alberto Ginés López and Janja Garnbret won the first-ever men's and women's Olympic climbing gold medals at the 2020 Tokyo Olympics in a combined event of all three disciplines.

Disciplines

Competition lead climbing 

In competition lead climbing, the competitors have 6 minutes to climb a  challenging, and usually significantly overhanging, pre-bolted sport climbing route (with pre-placed quickdraws), made by a route setter. For their safety, the competitor must also clip their safety rope into the quickdraws (that are attached to the bolts) while they ascend; failing to clip into a quickdraw terminates their climb at that position.  

In rock climbing, pre-bolted lead climbing routes are known as sport climbs, confusingly however, competition climbing is sometimes also called "sport climbing", even though it also has bouldering and speed climbing.

The climber is allowed one single attempt at the route.  Their score on the route is determined by the highest hold number they "controlled" before falling (i.e. all the holds are numbered, starting with 1 at the bottom); if in addition, they had "used" that hold to make a controlled movement for the next hold before falling, a "+" is added to their score. For example, falling while secured on hold 34, while reaching for hold 35, earns a score of "34+".

Between rounds, the competitors are collectively given 6 minutes to inspect — but not attempt — the next route. After the inspection, they are kept in an isolation area to prevent them from observing other competitors on the route and collecting its beta; they are thus effectively onsighting the route.

Competition bouldering 

In competition bouldering, the competitors have to "solve" multiple short  bouldering problems over a set time period, with the fewest falls.  In contrast to lead climbing, these boulder problems are more complex, but each boulder problem can be attempted multiple times within a certain time limit (usually 5 minutes in qualifiers and 4 minutes in finals).  As in all bouldering, the competitors do not use a rope or any climbing protection, but crash pads that are laid across the ground for safety.

Each individual boulder problem has an official start position with proscribed positions for all four of the competitor's limbs at the base of the problem. The competitor has completed the problem when they have placed their two hands on the marked "top" hold and held it long enough to receive confirmation from the judge. In addition, "zone holds" are located at the mid-point of the problem, which if secured, earn a half point, in lieu of failing to earn a full point by "topping".

Like in lead competition climbing, the competitors cannot see each other's attempts to learn route beta. The climber's score is determined by the overall number of routes "topped", the most "zone holds" reached, and the number of attempts needed. Where two climbers have the same score (i.e. "tops" plus "zones"), the number of "tops" takes precedence, and where they are still level, the least number of attempts takes precedence.

Competition speed climbing 

As the emphasis is on speed, the climbers do not have the time to clip into quickdraws (as per competition lead climbing) and instead use an auto-belay top rope for climbing protection. 

In qualification, competitors race in pairs in Lane A and Lane B, however, they are not racing against each other, but against the clock. Each competitor during qualification races twice — once in each Lane — and the eight fastest competitors, using their best time, reach the finals. In the finals, competitors race against each other in elimination rounds, with the winner, regardless of time, advancing until the ultimate winner is decided.

Notable competitions

IFSC

The most important competition climbing events are administered by the International Federation of Sport Climbing (IFSC):

 IFSC Climbing World Championships, a biennial event (i.e every two years), for male and female rock climbers with medals awarded in the four disciplines of lead climbing, bouldering, speed climbing, and combined (from the first three).

 IFSC Climbing World Cup, an annual competition, spread over several individual events held during the year, for male and female rock climbers with medals awarded in the four disciplines of lead climbing, bouldering, speed climbing, and combined (from the first three).

Olympics

In August 2016, it was announced that climbing would be included for the first time in the the 2020 Olympics. At the 2020 Olympics, competition climbers competed in a unique once-off combined format, where their lead, bouldering, and speed climbing rankings were added to determine a single medal event. The 2020 winners of this single combined format were Alberto Ginés López for men, and Janja Garnbret for women. 

For the 2024 Olympics, the format is changed to be closer to the IFSC-format with speed climbing separated into a standalone event, although lead climbing and bouldering are still a combined event (i.e. unlke the IFSC-format, there will not be standalone lead and bouldering medal events).

Notable competition climbers

As of 2023, the most successful overall male competition climber in history is Austrian climber Jakob Schubert, followed by Czech climber Adam Ondra, and French climber François Legrand.  Legrand is the most successful lead competition climber, Austrian climber Kilian Fischhuber is the most successful bouldering competition climber, and Chinese climber Zhong Qixin is the most successful speed competition climber.

As of 2023, the most successful overall female competition climber in history is Slovenian climber Janja Garnbret, followed by French climber Sandrine Levet, and Austrian climber Angela Eiter.  Garnbret is also the most successful lead competition climber, Levet also is the most successful bouldering competition climber, and Russian climber Tatiana Ruyga is the most successful speed competition climber.

As of 2023, Garnbret is the most dominant competition climber, male or female, of all time.

Notable non-competition climbers

As competition climbing developed in the 1980s, some of the leading sport climbers largely ignored it to focus on setting new grade milestones in sport climbing.  German climber Wolfgang Güllich, the strongest sport climber of that era, avoided the climbing competition circuit throughout his career saying: "competitions are good for earning money, I see it as nothing more".  In 1990, British leading climber Jerry Moffatt retired early from a promising competition climbing career saying: "I no longer had energy the energy to keep it all up. I wanted to get myself back again. I wanted to see my friends. I wanted to climb for myself. I wanted to do first ascents. Most of all I wanted to have fun". In 2001, American climber Chris Sharma, the strongest sport climber of his era, also retired early from competition climbing saying: "Personally, that's not ever really been my deal. I mean, competitions are fun, but 15 minutes after the competition they take the holds off. It's way more important for me to put up new routes and develop my vision in rock climbing. Create a legacy, create something lasting. No one remembers who won the freakin' World Cup in 1997, but people know who put up Action Directe".

Since 2010, it has become increasingly rarer for leading male and female rock climbers, in both sport climbing and bouldering, not to begin their careers as successful competition climbers.  Exceptions still exist, including leading French sport climber Seb Bouin, who wanted to instead focus on finding "mega lines" (a reference to Sharma's "King Lines") on outdoor crags, which he described as his sole motivation.

 See also 
 USA Climbing, body charged with regulating and administration competition climbing in America

 References 

 External links 
Rules of Competition Climbing, International Federation of Sport Climbing (2023)
IFSC World Cup Climbing Rules & Scoring Explained, Gear Junkie'' (July 2022)

 
Types of climbing
Individual sports